Shui Tsiu Lo Wai is a village in the Shap Pat Heung area of Yuen Long District, Hong Kong

Administration
Shui Tsiu Lo Wai is a recognized village under the New Territories Small House Policy.

Education
Shui Tsiu Lo Wai is divided between Primary One Admission (POA) School Net 73 and POA School Net 74. Within POA 73 are multiple aided schools (operated independently but funded with government money) and one government school: South Yuen Long Government Primary School (南元朗官立小學). POA 74 has multiple aided schools and one government school: Yuen Long Government Primary School (元朗官立小學).

See also
 Shui Tsiu San Tsuen

References

External links

 Delineation of area of existing village Shui Chiu Lo Wai (Shap Pat Heung) for election of resident representative (2019 to 2022)
 Webpage about Shui Tsiu Lo Wai
 Antiquities Advisory Board. Historic Building Appraisal. Kok Man Study Hall, Shui Tsiu Lo Wai Pictures
 Antiquities Advisory Board. Historic Building Appraisal. Cheung Ancestral Hall, No. 87 Shui Tsiu Lo Wa Pictures
 Antiquities Advisory Board. Historic Building Appraisal. Kan Ancestral Hall, No. 68 Shui Tsiu Lo Wai Pictures

Villages in Yuen Long District, Hong Kong
Shap Pat Heung